Dezghingea is a commune and village in the Gagauz Autonomous Territorial Unit of the Republic of Moldova.  The 2004 census listed the commune as having a population of 5,252 people.   Gagauz total 4,963. Minorities included 158 Moldovans, 67 Russians, 33 Ukrainians, 14 Bulgarians and 2 Poles.

Its geographical coordinates are 46° 25' 28" North, 28° 37' 0" East.

References

Dezghingea